Mitochondrial tRNA pseudouridine27/28 synthase (Pus2, Pus2p, RNA:pseudouridine synthases 2) is an enzyme with systematic name mitochondrial tRNA-uridine27/28 uracil mutase. This enzyme catalyses the following chemical reaction

 mitochondrial tRNA uridine27/28  mitochondrial tRNA pseudouridine27/28

The mitochondrial enzyme Pus2p is specific for position 27 or 28 in mitochondrial tRNA.

See also
PUS1
TRNA_pseudouridine38/39_synthase

References

External links 
 

EC 5.4.99